Bipradash Barua (born September 20, 1940) is a Bangladeshi novelist. He was awarded Bangla Academy Literary Award in 1991 and Ekushey Padak in 2014.

Works
Novels
 Achena (The Unknown, 1975)
 Bhoy, Bhalobasa Nirbasan (Fear, Love, Exile, 1988)
 Samudracar O Bidrohira (The Sea-spies and the Insurgents, 1990)
 Muktijoddhara (Freedom-Fighters, 1991)
 Bhitare Ekjan Kande (Someone Weeps Within, 1996)
 Shraman Gautam (1996)
 Ami Tomar  Kache Samudrer  Ekti Dheu Jama  Rekhechi (I Kept with You a Wave of the Sea, 1997)
 Sraman Goutam

Awards
 Kathashilpi Literary Award (1982)
 International Youth Anniversary Medal (1985)
 Agrani Bank Award for Juvenile Literature (1395 and 1398 BS)
 Bangla Academy Literary Award (1991)
 Atish Dipangkar Gold Medal (1997)
 Ekushey Padak (2014)

References

1940 births
Living people
Bangladeshi male writers
Bangladeshi Buddhists
Bengali-language writers
Recipients of Bangla Academy Award
Recipients of the Ekushey Padak
University of Dhaka alumni